Robert Bain may refer to

Robert Bain (politician) (born 1946), Canadian politician
Robert Bain (artist) (1911–1973), Scottish sculptor
Robert Nisbet Bain (1854–1909), British historian and linguist

See also
 Bain (surname)
 Bain (disambiguation)